V. Hovhannes Hagopian was an Armenian professor of Ottoman Turkish and Persian in the Anatolia College in Merzifon. He was the author of an Ottoman-Turkish Conversation-Grammar, published in Heidelberg in 1907.

Hagopian was deported, probably to his death, from Anatolia College on 10 August 1915 during the Armenian Genocide.

References

External links

Linguists from Armenia
People who died in the Armenian genocide
Year of birth missing
Year of death missing